Totoltepec may refer to:

San Andrés Totoltepec, D.F.
San Martín Totoltepec, Puebla
Totoltepec de Guerrero, Puebla